The Brazil-Argentina football rivalry is a sports rivalry between the national football teams of the two countries and their respective sets of fans. Games between the two teams, even those that are only friendly matches, are often marked by notable and controversial incidents. The rivalry has also been referred to as the "Battle of the Americas." FIFA has described it as the "essence of football rivalry". CNN ranked it second on their top 10 list of international football rivalries—only below the older England–Scotland football rivalry.

Brazil-Argentina matches are often known for the high level of competitiveness and talent between the two teams. Brazil and Argentina are the two teams with the highest average football Elo Rating calculated over the entire team history, with 1994 and 1984 points respectively. Both are also routinely ranked among the top ten national teams in the world in both the FIFA World Rankings and the World Football Elo Ratings. Both countries have produced players considered at the time the best in the world, such as Alfredo Di Stéfano, Diego Maradona, and Lionel Messi for Argentina. While Pelé, Neymar, Ronaldo and Ronaldinho are the most remembered from Brazil.

History
The origins of the football rivalry between Argentina and Brazil can be traced to a time before football became popular in both countries. Today, few remember wars and other political confrontations between both countries, and only recall matches, victories, goals, and other sport-related incidents. Their rivalry is found in almost all sports, but a men's football match between Argentina and Brazil is one that neither side wants to lose, and often acquires more importance than the championship within which it takes place. To exemplify the intensity of this rivalry, one only needs to remember that after the 1946 incidents (see below), the two teams did not play against each other for ten years; either team would decline to play in a given cup so that they would never have to play against the neighboring country.

A Brazilian defender threw the ball before Laguna reaches it, during the 1916 Copa América. Brazil wore a green and yellow striped jersey for that game.

Since their first match in 1914, the national teams have played 105 matches counting friendlies, FIFA World Cup matches, and other official competitions (excluding matches between youth sides).

Even though there is a difference depending on whether the Argentine Football Association (AFA) or the Brazilian Football Confederation (CBF) does the counting, the near-balance is not in dispute. According to FIFA, of the 105 matches played between both national teams, Argentina and Brazil hold 38 and 41 victories, respectively, with 26 draws. Argentina has 160 goals, while Brazil has 163. Only counting World Cup matches, Brazil is slightly ahead with two wins, one draw, and one loss, whereas in the Copa América matches, Argentina holds a comfortable lead with 14 victories, 8 draws, and 9 defeats. Of the 60 friendly matches, 25 went to Brazil, 20 to Argentina, and 16 were draws.

Both captains shake hands before playing a match at the 1923 Copa América.

Since the first match between the two countries in 1914, Argentina dominated the early years with more than double the Brazilian victories. This is even when Brazil was world champion in 1958 and 1962. However, the 1970s proved to be dark times for Argentina, with seven defeats, four draws, and only one victory, although it should be mentioned that one of the draws came in the 1978 World Cup played in Argentina. The 0–0 draw helped Argentina reach their second World Cup final and their first World Cup title. In the 1978 World Cup, Brazil was left behind, playing for third place.

The highest scoring wins between these two nations were for Argentina 6–1 (at home in Buenos Aires, 1940) and 1–5 (away at Rio de Janeiro, 1939), for Brazil 6–2 (at home in Rio de Janeiro, 1945) and 1–4 (away at Buenos Aires, 1960).

The most important victory matches between these two nations were, for Argentina, the 2–0 match in the 1937 Copa América final, the tie 0–0 in the 1978 World Cup that helped them to reach the final and their first World Cup title, the 1–0 victory over Brazil in the 1990 World Cup which eliminated Brazil from the World Cup in the Round of 16, and the 1–0 victory over Brazil in the 2021 Copa América Final, played in the Maracana Stadium.

For Brazil, the most important were two Copa America victories in the Copa America finals. The first, in Peru in 2004, saw Brazil win in a penalty shootout (4–2) after a (2–2) draw, and the second was a (3–0) win in the 2007 Copa América final played in Venezuela. Another important victory for Brazil was the 2005 FIFA Confederations Cup final, where the Brazilians defeated Argentina 4–1 in the decisive match.

Statistics

Major official titles comparison

Head-to-head

Knockouts 

 1937 Copa América Final: Argentina 2 x 0 Brazil - Argentina Champion
 1990 World Cup Round of 16: Argentina 1 x 0 Brazil - Argentina Classified
 1993 Copa América Quarterfinal: Argentina 1 (6) x (5) 1 Brazil - Argentina Classified
 1995 Copa América Quarterfinal: Argentina 2 (2) x (4) 2 Brazil - Brazil Classified
 1999 Copa América Quarterfinal: Argentina 1 x 2 Brazil - Brazil Classified
 2004 Copa América Final: Argentina 2 (2) x (4) 2 Brazil - Brazil Champion
 2005 Confederations Cup Final: Argentina 1 x 4 Brazil - Brazil Champion
 2007 Copa América Final: Argentina 0 x 3 Brazil - Brazil Champion
 2019 Copa América Semifinal: Argentina 0 x 2 Brazil - Brazil Classified
 2021 Copa América Final: Argentina 1 x 0 Brazil - Argentina Champion

List of matches 
Complete list of matches between both sides:

Note: Matches held before 1914  are not recognized by FIFA so the International Federation considers that Brazilian squads formed until then were not official representatives of the country.

Before 1914, Argentina had toured Brazil twice, the first time in 1908, returning in 1912.

Recognised matches

Unrecognised matches 

List of matches played from 1908 to 1914 – before the CBF was established – between the Argentina national team and diverse representatives (named themselves "Brazil"), such as Liga Paulista and Liga Carioca combined, or clubs (Paulistano, SC Americano), among others. It is believed that in the first match held on 2 July 1908, Argentina wore the light blue and white shirt for the first time, although other sources state that the shirt debuted in a Copa Newton match v Uruguay in September that year. In 1913, a Liga Paulista team arrived in Argentina to play two friendly matches there.

Pelé–Maradona rivalry

Among the elite group of players, football fans consider as contenders for the title, of the best player of all time, Brazil's Pelé and Argentina's Diego Maradona are probably the most famous, and generally, dominate polls on the subject. Some of their countrymen also feature regularly in such debates. The next most notable pair are perhaps Garrincha (Brazilian) and Alfredo Di Stéfano (Argentine). The most dominant figures from the two countries in the modern game are Neymar (Brazilian) and Lionel Messi (Argentine). Both Pelé and Maradona have declared Neymar and Messi their respective "successors".

However, the overriding discussion about which of Pelé and Maradona is the greater has proved to be never-ending. Even though they have been considered the best players of their times, many consider the comparison between them useless, as they played during incomparable eras and in different leagues. The debate between the pair has been described as "the rivalry of their countries in microcosm".

Pelé was given the title "Athlete of the Century" by the International Olympic Committee. In 1999, Time magazine named Pelé one of the 100 Most Important People of the 20th Century. Also, he was elected Football Player of the Century, by France Football's Golden Ball Winners in 1999, Football Player of the Century, and South America Football Player of the Century, both by the International Federation of Football History & Statistics (IFFHS), 1999. For his part, Maradona has been named Best Player of the 20th Century by the Globe Soccer Awards, best soccer player in World Cup history both by The Times and FourFourTwo regarded him as the "Best Football Player of All Time". He was also elected as the "Greatest Athlete in History" by Corriere Dello Sport – Stadio.

The controversy reached a climax during the FIFA player of the century in 2000, in which Maradona was voted Player of the Century in an official internet poll, garnering 53.6% of the votes against 18.53% for Pelé. Shortly before the ceremony, FIFA decided to add a second award and appointed a "Football Family" committee composed of football journalists that gave to Pelé the title of 'best player of the century to make it a draw. This move was criticized in Argentina, that suspected Pelé was rewarded for his constant support of FIFA, in contrast to Maradona's frequent criticism. Others believe that FIFA was considering issues other than football, notably Maradona's drug problem. Maradona left the ceremony right after receiving his award and before Pelé was given his.

In another internet poll that took place in 2002, Maradona received another award from FIFA, as one of his goals was selected as the World Cup Goal of the Century. One of Pelé's goals received third place, while Maradona had a second goal selected as fourth.

Despite their frequent confrontations, usually through quotations by the media, Pelé was the guest star of Maradona's TV show La Noche del 10 ("The Night of the #10"), where they had a friendly chat and played a bout of headers. The two players also showed great respect for each other despite differences, such as when Pelé stated in 2018 that Maradona was better than Messi, or in 2019 when Maradona prayed for Pelé to recover after the Brazilian legend was admitted to hospital for health reasons. When Maradona died on 25 November 2020, Pelé was among the major football figures to mourn Maradona's death.

Famous players and football figures often give their opinion on the Maradona and Pelé rivalry, sometimes choosing one over the other. Others prefer not to compare them, as they played at very different times.

Incidents and historical matches

1925 Copa América

For the 1925 Copa América, Argentina and Brazil played the final match at Sportivo Barracas Stadium, on Christmas Day. The unusual date was not an obstacle to drawing a crowd of more than 30,000 people. In a crowded stadium, the match started in a tense atmosphere: at 27 minutes Lagarto intercepted a back pass by Ludovico Bidoglio and passed the ball to Arthur Friedenreich, who beat Américo Tesoriere with a strong shot. It was 1-0 for the Brazilians. Three minutes later, Nilo scored the second for the canarinha. The crowd was astonished, because if the Brazilian lead was maintained, a new match had to be played to determinate the champion.

Before completing the first half, a dangerous counterattack by the visitors was stopped by Ramón Muttis with a strong foul on Friedenreich, who in turn, reacted with a kick. The Argentine responded with a punch at the Brazilian's face, and the incident unleashed a buzz among several players and also with some spectators who invaded the pitch. The game was suspended, and only resumed - without a sending-off - after a hug between Friedenreich and Muttis that sealed a truce. However, the incident made a dent in the Brazilian players and the match changed course: at the end of the first half Antonio Cerrotti reduced the deficit and opened the road to recovery. The equaliser came ten minutes into the second half through Manuel Seoane. The match ended tied 2–2, and Argentina won its second Copa America in history in a rugged match against Brazil. The incidents did not go unnoticed in Brazil and some local newspapers referred to the game as "The Barracas' War". Because of this match, Argentina and Brazil did not play-officially again for 11 years.

1937 Copa América final

In the 1937 South American Championship (currently Copa América), the rivalry between both teams was already something of national pride. There were verbal confrontations between both parties, and Argentine fans often taunted the Brazilians by calling them macaquitos and making monkey sounds. The final match, held in Buenos Aires, was played between the two sides and was goalless after 90 minutes. In extra time, Argentina scored two goals. Questioning one of the goals and fearful for their own safety, the Brazilian players decided to leave the stadium before the match was officially finished. The Brazilian press has since called this match "jogo da vergonha" ("the shame game"). Argentina won, 2–0, and was South American champion again.

1939 Copa Roca

The 1939 edition of Roca Cup was the longest in history, having been defined after four matches. The first two games were held in Estádio São Januário in Rio de Janeiro. The first one, held in January, ended 5–1 to Argentina.

A second match was held only one week later, with the Brazilian team seeking revenge for the previous defeat. The match was vibrating; first Brazil went ahead 1–0, then Argentina recovered to lead 1–2, and Brazil then drew level at 2–2. Shortly before the end of the match, the referee, the same as in the previous match, gave a penalty to Brazil. Furious, Argentina player Arcadio López verbally attacked the referee and had to be escorted out of the pitch by police. The Argentine team, enraged by the actions of the referee and the police, left the pitch. The penalty that gave Brazil the 3–2 victory was scored without a goalkeeper, because the entire Argentine team had already walked off the pitch.

As both teams had won one match each, a third game was scheduled to be played at Parque Antarctica in São Paulo. The match ended 2–2 after extra time therefore a fourth and final match was held in the same venue and was won by Argentina 3–0, which finally won the trophy.

1945–1946 incidents 

In the 1945 Copa Roca match that Brazil won 6–2, young Brazilian Ademir de Menezes fractured Argentine José Battagliero's leg. Though it seemed to be only an unfortunate accident, the game was played roughly and sometimes violently.

A few months later, the 1946 South American Championship final again involved Argentina and Brazil. There was widespread media coverage, and the conviction that it would be a rough match. Twenty-eight minutes after the beginning, when both teams went for a free ball, Brazilian Jair Rosa Pinto fractured Argentine captain José Salomón's tibia and fibula. General disorder ensued, with Argentine and Brazilian players fighting on the pitch with the police. The public invaded the pitch and both teams had to go to the dressing rooms. After order was restored the game continued, and Argentina won the match 2–0. Salomón never recovered completely nor played professional football after the incident.

1974 World Cup 

It would be the first ever meeting between Brazil and Argentina in the FIFA World Cup. Defending champions Brazil faced Argentina in West Germany's Niedersachsenstadion in Hanover in the second round as both were placed in Group A. Brazil won it by 2–1 via goals from Rivelino and Jairzinho whereas Brindisi scored the only goal for Argentina.

1978 World Cup 

The Group B of the second round was essentially a battle between Argentina and Brazil, and it was resolved in controversial circumstances. In the first round of group games, Brazil beat Peru 3–0 while Argentina saw off Poland 2–0. Brazil and Argentina then played out a tense and violent goalless draw – also known as "A Batalha de Rosário" ("The Battle of Rosario"), so both teams went into the last round of matches with three points. Argentina had an advantage that their match against Peru kicked off several hours after Brazil's match with Poland.

Brazil won their match 3–1, so Argentina could know that they had to beat Peru by four clear goals to go through to the final. Argentina managed it with what some saw as a suspicious degree of ease. Trailing 2–0 at half-time, Peru simply collapsed in the second half, and Argentina eventually won 6–0. Rumours suggested that Peru might have been somehow illicitly induced not to try too hard (especially because the Peruvian goalkeeper, Ramón Quiroga, was born in Argentina); but nothing could be proved, and Argentina met the Netherlands in the final.

Brazil, denied a final place by Argentina's 6–0 win over Peru, took third place from an enterprising Italy side and were dubbed "moral champions" by coach Cláudio Coutinho, because they did not win the tournament but did not lose a single match either.

1982 World Cup 
Brazil and Argentina were grouped together (along with Italy) in the second group stage in Group C, which was dubbed as the "group of death". In the opener, Italy prevailed 2–1 over Argentina. Argentina now needed a win over Brazil on the second day, but they were no match, as the Brazilians' attacking game, characterised by nimble, one-touch passing on-the-run, eclipsed the reigning world champions. The final score of 3–1 – Argentina only scoring in the last minute – could have been much higher had Brazil centre-forward Serginho not wasted a series of near-certain scoring opportunities. Frustrated because of the poor refereeing and the imminent loss, Diego Maradona kicked Brazilian player Batista and received a straight red card. Brazil lost their next game to Italy and thus exited the World Cup along with Argentina.

1990 World Cup (The "holy water" scandal) 

The last time both teams met in a World Cup match was in the Round of 16 at the 1990 World Cup, which featured Argentina defeating Brazil 1–0 with a goal from Claudio Caniggia after a pass from Diego Maradona. The end of the match was controversial, however, with Brazilian player Branco accusing the Argentina training staff of giving him a bottle of water laced with tranquillizers while they were tending to an injured player. Years later, Maradona admitted the truth on an Argentine television show, saying that Branco had been given "holy water". The Argentine Football Association and the team coach of the time, Carlos Bilardo, denied that the "holy water" incident ever took place, though prior to the previous denial Bilardo said of Branco's allegation: "I'm not saying it didn't happen."

1991 Copa América match
Argentina defeated Brazil 3–2 in Santiago in the first match of the final pool. Five players were sent off: Claudio Caniggia and Mazinho after tangling in the 31st minute; Carlos Enrique and Márcio Santos for another fight in the 61st minute, with one player leaving on a stretcher; and Careca Bianchezi in the 80th minute, two minutes after coming on as a substitute.

1993 Copa América match
Argentina and Brazil finished 1–1 at the quarterfinal match, played in Guayaquil. Brazil started winning the game, but Leonardo Rodríguez drew with the head after a corner kick at the second part. In penalties, Los Gauchos defeated 5–4 and advanced to the quarter-finals. Argentina finally won the Copa América title after defeating Mexico in the final.

1995 Copa América match
Held in Uruguay, the two nations met at the quarter-finals stage on 17 July 1995. The Brazilian Túlio became famous for scoring a late equalizer five minutes from time after controlling the ball with his left arm. Despite the obvious foul, the referee, Alberto Tejada Noriega of Peru, claimed he did not see the incident and the goal therefore stood. The game finished with a 2–2 draw and Brazil went on to win on penalties. The Argentine media labeled the incident as the "hand of the devil", a reference to the controversial goal scored by Diego Maradona in the 1986 World Cup against England.

2004 Copa América Final

Argentina was winning 2–1, but in a spectacular turn of events, Adriano scored a goal in the last minute of the match, taking the match to penalties, where Brazil won with Júlio César stopping an impossible shot from Andrés D'Alessandro. Brazil was playing with its second-string team and this victory could be considered an underdog one.

2005 Confederations Cup Final

In 2005, Brazil and Argentina participated in the 2005 FIFA Confederations Cup. Brazil entered the competition as the reigning World Cup champions at the time. Since Brazil had also won the Copa América the previous year, however, Copa runners-up Argentina was allowed to participate in the tournament to take up the vacated berth. In the semi-finals, Brazil eliminated host nation Germany, while Argentina eliminated Mexico. This competition was the first time the two rivals would meet in a final game of a tournament sponsored by FIFA. In a surprising turn of events, the Brazilian team won the game easily, thrashing the Argentines 4–1. Adriano scored twice for Brazil, along with Kaká and Ronaldinho, while Pablo Aimar scored Argentina's only goal.

2007 Copa América Final

Brazil defeated Argentina 3–0 in Maracaibo, Venezuela, at the final. The goals scored were by Júlio Baptista, an own goal by Roberto Ayala, and by Dani Alves.

2008 Summer Olympics – Beijing 

Defending champions Argentina and Brazil met on 19 August in the semifinal game of the Summer Olympics. The game, billed as a tête-à-tête between Lionel Messi and Ronaldinho, Barcelona teammates, was in the end a hard-fought clash between two historic rivals, marred by numerous fouls and two ejections for Brazil. Argentina convincingly won with a score of 3–0, and went on to beat Nigeria 1–0 in the final, being the first in obtaining two consecutive gold medals in football in 40 years and the third overall after the Olympic teams of the United Kingdom and Uruguay. Brazil eventually won the gold medal at the Olympics themselves playing at home in 2016.

2019 Copa América
Brazil and Argentina met at the semifinal of the 2019 Copa América, which was hosted in Brazil. Brazil defeated Argentina 2–0 with goals by Gabriel Jesus and Firmino. Argentina eventually placed third and Brazil went on to win their 9th Copa América title.

2021 Copa América Final

The 2021 Copa América was originally scheduled to be jointly held in Colombia and Argentina in 2020, but it was postponed to 2021 due to the COVID-19 pandemic. Colombia and Argentina were removed as hosts due to social unrest in Colombia and the COVID-19 pandemic in Argentina. Brazil was chosen to host the tournament. In the final, Argentina defeated Brazil 1–0 with the only goal by Ángel Di María at the Maracanã Stadium to win their 15th Copa América title, after 28 years without titles.

Club level official titles comparison
Note: Only official competitions (organised by CONMEBOL and/or other continental confederations) are included

Note

Copa Libertadores de America

In the history of this tournament, played since 1960, only twice has a Brazilian team captured a title on Argentine soil. In 1963, Brazilian side Santos defeated the most popular Argentine club, Boca Juniors, and in 2017, when Grêmio defeated Club Atlético Lanús . However, the same Argentine club team, Boca Juniors, has celebrated three of its six titles on Brazilian soil, defeating Palmeiras in 2000, Santos in 2003 and Grêmio in 2007. The two greatest Argentine and Brazilian players that have ever played this sport had at one point played in these same two clubs: Pelé for Santos while Diego Maradona had done the same for Boca Juniors. It has been reported that in all three of Boca Juniors' victories on Brazilian soil, Boca's players were not allowed to properly sleep in their hotel rooms the night before their final matches because of the chaos and noise created by Brazilian fans outside the hotel rooms, who attempted to disrupt the Argentine players from performing to their best of their abilities the following day.

In the international arena, the most successful Argentine clubs are Boca Juniors (six Libertadores and three Intercontinental Cups), Independiente (seven Libertadores and two Intercontinental Cups), Estudiantes de La Plata (four Libertadores and one Intercontinental Cup), River Plate (four Libertadores and one Intercontinental Cup), Vélez Sársfield (one Libertadores and one Intercontinental), San Lorenzo (one Libertadores, one Copa Mercosur and one Copa Sudamericana), Argentinos Juniors (one Libertadores) and Racing Club (one Libertadores and one Intercontinental Cup).

The most successful Brazilian clubs are São Paulo (three Libertadores, one FIFA Club World Cup and two Intercontinental Cups), Santos (three Libertadores and two Intercontinental Cups), Grêmio (three Libertadores and one Intercontinental Cup), Palmeiras (three Libertadores, one Copa Mercosur and one Recopa Sudamericana), Internacional (two Libertadores and one FIFA Club World Cup), Cruzeiro (two Libertadores), Corinthians (one Libertadores and two FIFA Club World Cups), Flamengo, (two Libertadores, one Copa Mercosur, one Copa de Oro, one Recopa and one Intercontinental Cup), Vasco da Gama (one Libertadores, one South American Championship of Champions and one Copa Mercosur) AND Atlético Mineiro (one Libertadores and two Copa Conmebol).

Women's football

The Brazil women's national team is a successful women's football team. It was runner-up in the FIFA Women's World Cup of 2007, and won a silver medal at the Olympic games in 2004 and 2008. In comparison, Argentina does not have a professional (or even semi-professional) women's football league; the members of the Argentina women's national football team are all amateur players despite their clubs often being affiliated with prominent men's professional clubs. Although the two teams usually have to battle for the top qualification spots for CONMEBOL when the World Cup qualification comes around, this rivalry does not provide the passion that men's matches encounter yet.

Brazil won every game of the Sudamericano Femenino against Argentina until the 2006 edition, when Argentina finally beat them 2–0 in the final group stage, awarding Argentina the championship. Argentina did not participate in the 1991 South American competition and was second to Brazil in the following three tournaments. Beginning with the 2003 edition, both champion and runner-up qualified for the World Cup. As Argentina has not been past the group stages in the World Cup, the two teams have not met in the Olympic Football Tournament yet.

Notes

See also
 Argentina–Brazil relations

References

External links

 Argentina vs. Brazil statistics by RSSSF
 Brazil vs. Argentina rivalry on Netvasco.com  
 Argentina vs. Brazil September 5 2009 results

 
football
Brazil
Brazil national football team rivalries
International association football rivalries